Agua Dulce Independent School District is a public school district based in the community of Agua Dulce, Texas (USA). The district serves students in west central Nueces, and east central Jim Wells counties. Within Nueces County it includes Agua Dulce and half of Rancho Banquete.

History 
In 1910 the Agua Dulce Independent School District was founded; Sophinia Thompson was the first teacher. The school system was consolidated with that of Bentonville in 1932.

Finances
As of the 2010-2011 school year, the appraised valuation of property in the district was $128,302,000. The maintenance tax rate was $0.117 and the bond tax rate was $0.021 per $100 of appraised valuation.

Academic achievement
In 2011, the school district was rated "academically acceptable" by the Texas Education Agency.  Forty-nine percent of districts in Texas in 2011 received the same rating. No state accountability ratings will be given to districts in 2012. A school district in Texas can receive one of four possible rankings from the Texas Education Agency: Exemplary (the highest possible ranking), Recognized, Academically Acceptable, and Academically Unacceptable (the lowest possible ranking).

Historical district TEA accountability ratings
2011: Academically Acceptable
2010: Academically Acceptable
2009: Academically Acceptable
2008: Academically Acceptable
2007: Academically Acceptable
2006: Academically Acceptable
2005: Academically Acceptable
2004: Academically Acceptable

Schools
In the 2011-2012 school year, the district operated two schools.
Agua Dulce High School (Grades 6-12)
Agua Dulce Elementary (Grades PK-5)

See also

List of school districts in Texas
List of high schools in Texas

References

External links 
 

School districts in Nueces County, Texas
School districts in Jim Wells County, Texas
School districts established in 1910
1910 establishments in Texas